A number of units of measurement have been used in Tanzania to measure length, mass, capacity, etc.  The metric system was adopted in Tanzania from 1967 to 1969.

System before metric system

A number of units were used.

Zanzibar

Several units were used in Zanzibar

Length

One ohra was equal to 0.571 m (22.48 in).

Weight

One bazla was equal to 15.525 kg (32.226 lb).        One mane was equal to 2.0071 lb.  One franzella of 36 rotoli was equal to 35.2822 lb.

Capacity
One djezla was equal to 257.4 L (7.305 bushels).

References

Tanzanian culture
Tanzania